The beta-2 adrenergic receptor (β2 adrenoreceptor), also known as ADRB2, is a cell membrane-spanning beta-adrenergic receptor that binds epinephrine (adrenaline), a hormone and neurotransmitter  whose signaling, via adenylate cyclase stimulation through trimeric Gs proteins, increased cAMP, and downstream L-type calcium channel interaction, mediates physiologic responses such as smooth muscle relaxation and bronchodilation.

Robert J.Lefkowitz and Brian Kobilka studied beta 2 adrenergic receptor as a model system which rewarded them the 2012 Nobel Prize in Chemistry “for groundbreaking discoveries that reveal the inner workings of an important family of such receptors: G-protein-coupled-receptors”.

The official symbol for the human gene encoding the β2 adrenoreceptor is ADRB2.

Gene
The  gene is intronless. Different polymorphic forms, point mutations, and/or downregulation of this gene are associated with nocturnal asthma, obesity and type 2 diabetes.

Structure
The 3D crystallographic structure (see figure and links to the right) of the β2-adrenergic receptor has been determined by making a fusion protein with lysozyme to increase the hydrophilic surface area of the protein for crystal contacts.  An alternative method, involving production of a fusion protein with an agonist, supported lipid-bilayer co-crystallization and generation of a 3.5 Å resolution structure.

The Crystal Structure of the β2Adrenergic Receptor-Gs protein complex was solved in 2011. The largest conformational changes in the β2AR include a 14 Å outward movement at the cytoplasmic end of transmembrane segment 6 (TM6) and an alpha helical extension of the cytoplasmic end of TM5.

Mechanism
This receptor is directly associated with one of its ultimate effectors, the class C L-type calcium channel CaV1.2. This receptor-channel complex is coupled to the Gs G protein, which activates adenylyl cyclase, catalysing the formation of cyclic adenosine monophosphate (cAMP) which then activates protein kinase A, and counterbalancing phosphatase PP2A. Protein kinase A then goes on to phosphorylate (and thus inactivate) myosin light-chain kinase, which causes smooth muscle relaxation, accounting for the vasodilatory effects of beta 2 stimulation. The assembly of the signaling complex provides a mechanism that ensures specific and rapid signaling. A two-state biophysical and molecular model has been proposed to account for the pH and REDOX sensitivity of this and other GPCRs.

Beta-2 adrenergic receptors have also been found to couple with Gi, possibly providing a mechanism by which response to ligand is highly localized within cells. In contrast, Beta-1 adrenergic receptors are coupled only to Gs, and stimulation of these results in a more diffuse cellular response. This appears to be mediated by cAMP induced PKA phosphorylation of the receptor.
Interestingly, Beta-2 adrenergic receptor was observed to localize exclusively to the T-tubular network of adult cardiomyocytes, as opposed to Beta-1 adrenergic receptor, which is observed also on the outer plasma membrane of the cell

Function

Musculoskeletal system

Activation of the β2 adrenoreceptor with long-acting agents such as oral clenbuterol and intravenously-infused albuterol results in skeletomuscular hypertrophy and anabolism. The comprehensive anabolic, lipolytic, and ergogenic effects of long-acting β2 agonists such as clenbuterol render them frequent targets as performance-enhancing drugs in athletes. Consequently, such agents are monitored for and generally banned by WADA (World Anti-Doping Agency) with limited permissible usage under therapeutic exemptions; clenbuterol and other β2 adrenergic agents remain banned not as a beta-agonist, but rather an anabolic agent. These effects are largely attractive within agricultural contexts insofar that β2 adrenergic agents have seen notable extra-label usage in food-producing animals and livestock. While many countries including the United States have prohibited extra-label usage in food-producing livestock, the practice is still observed in many countries.

Circulatory system
 Heart muscle contraction
 Increase cardiac output (minor degree compared to β1).
Increases heart rate in sinoatrial node (SA node) (chronotropic effect).
Increases atrial cardiac muscle contractility. (inotropic effect).
Increases contractility and automaticity of ventricular cardiac muscle.
Dilate hepatic artery.
Dilate arterioles to skeletal muscle.

Eye
In the normal eye, beta-2 stimulation by salbutamol increases intraocular pressure via net:
 Increase in production of aqueous humour by the ciliary process,
 Subsequent increased pressure-dependent uveoscleral outflow of humour, despite reduced drainage of humour via the Canal of Schlemm.

In glaucoma, drainage is reduced (open-angle glaucoma) or blocked completely (closed-angle glaucoma). In such cases, beta-2 stimulation with its consequent increase in humour production is highly contra-indicated, and conversely, a topical beta-2 antagonist such as timolol may be employed.

Digestive system
 Glycogenolysis and gluconeogenesis in liver.
 Glycogenolysis and lactate release in skeletal muscle.
 Contract sphincters of Gastrointestinal tract.
 Thickened secretions from salivary glands.
Insulin and glucagon secretion from pancreas.

Other
 Inhibit histamine-release from mast cells.
 Increase protein content of secretions from lacrimal glands.
 Receptor also present in cerebellum.
 Bronchiole dilation (targeted while treating asthma attacks)
 Involved in brain - immune - communication

Ligands

Agonists

Spasmolytics used in asthma and COPD
 Short-acting β2 agonists (SABA)
 bitolterol
 fenoterol
 hexoprenaline
 isoprenaline (INN) or isoproterenol (USAN)
 levosalbutamol (INN) or levalbuterol (USAN)
 orciprenaline (INN) or metaproterenol (USAN)
 pirbuterol
 procaterol
 salbutamol (INN) or albuterol (USAN)
 terbutaline
 Long-acting β2 agonists (LABA)
 arformoterol (some consider it to be an ultra-LABA)
 bambuterol
 clenbuterol
 formoterol
 salmeterol
 Ultra-long-acting β2 agonists (ultra-LABA)
 carmoterol
 indacaterol
 milveterol (GSK 159797)
 olodaterol
 vilanterol (GSK 642444)

Tocolytic agents
 Short-acting β2 agonists (SABA)
 fenoterol
 hexoprenaline
 isoxsuprine
 ritodrine
 salbutamol (INN) or albuterol (USAN)
 terbutaline

β2 agonists used for other purposes
 zilpaterol

Antagonists
(Beta blockers)
butoxamine*
First generation (non-selective) β-blockers
ICI-118,551*
Propranolol

* denotes selective antagonist to the receptor.

Allosteric modulators
 compound-6FA, PAM at intracellular binding site

Interactions 

Beta-2 adrenergic receptor has been shown to interact with:

 AKAP12, 
 OPRD1, 
 Grb2,
 SNX27  and
 SLC9A3R1.

See also 
Other adrenergic receptors
Alpha-1 adrenergic receptor
Alpha-2 adrenergic receptor
Beta-1 adrenergic receptor
Beta-3 adrenergic receptor
 Discovery and development of beta2 agonists

References

Further reading

External links 
 
 
 

Adrenergic receptors